The 1934 season was Wisła Krakóws 26th year as a club.

Friendlies

Mixed teams

Ekstraklasa

Squad, appearances and goals

|-
|}

Goalscorers

Disciplinary record

References

External links
1934 Wisła Kraków season at historiawisly.pl

Wisła Kraków seasons
Association football clubs 1934 season
Wisla